Ammaar Shabbir Ghadiyali (born 30 May 1997 in Dar es Salaam) is a Tanzanian swimmer. At the 2012 Summer Olympics, he competed in the Men's 100 metre freestyle, finishing in 55th place overall in the heats, failing to qualify for the semifinals. He also competed in the 200 metre event at the 2013 World Aquatics Championships. In 2014, he represented Tanzania at the 2014 Summer Youth Olympics held in Nanjing, China.

Ammaar attended the International Baccaleaureate program at Bayview Secondary School in Richmond Hill, Ontario, Canada. He graduated in 2015. He now attends Toronto Metropolitan University for Business Management.

References

Tanzanian male freestyle swimmers
1997 births
Living people
People from Dar es Salaam
Olympic swimmers of Tanzania
Swimmers at the 2012 Summer Olympics
Tanzanian people of Indian descent
Sportspeople of Indian descent
Swimmers at the 2014 Summer Youth Olympics
Swimmers at the 2015 African Games
20th-century Tanzanian people
21st-century Tanzanian people